Laniocera is a genus of passerine birds in the family Tityridae. It has traditionally been placed in the cotinga family, but evidence strongly suggest it is better placed in Tityridae, where now placed by SACC. They share the common name "mourner" with the species in the genera Schiffornis, Laniisoma and Rhytipterna.

Species

References

 
Bird genera
Taxa named by René Lesson
Taxonomy articles created by Polbot